Grevillea masonii, commonly known as Mason's grevillea, is a species of flowering plant in the family Proteaceae and is endemic to a restricted area of New South Wales. It is a low-growing shrub with egg-shaped to elliptic leaves, and red and green flowers with a green style.

Description

Taxonomy
Grevillea masonii was first formally described in 1994 by Peter M. Olde and Neil R. Marriott in the journal Telopea from specimens collected near Casino in 1992. The specific epithet (masonii) honours David Mason, a plant collector from northern New South Wales.

Distribution and habitat
Mason's grevillea grows in woodland and is only known from near Casino and Grafton in northern New South Wales.

Conservation status
Grevillea masonii is listed as "endangered" under the Australian Government Environment Protection and Biodiversity Conservation Act 1999 and the New South Wales Government Biodiversity Conservation Act 2016 (NSW). The main threats to the species include inappropriate fire regimes, drought, weed invasion and dieback caused by Phytophthora cinnamomi.

Use in horticulture
This grevillea can be grown from seed or from cuttings and is hardy in well-drained soil in a sunny or partly shaded position.

References

masonii
Proteales of Australia
Flora of New South Wales
Plants described in 1994